Kessleria is a genus of moths of the family Yponomeutidae.

Species
Subgenus Kessleria
Kessleria alpicella-group
Kessleria alpicella - (Stainton, 1851)
Kessleria mixta - Huemer & Tarmann, 1992 
Kessleria alternans-group
Kessleria alpmaritimae - Huemer & Mutanen, 2015
Kessleria alternans - (Staudinger, 1870)
Kessleria cottiensis - Huemer & Mutanen, 2015
Kessleria dimorpha - Huemer & Mutanen, 2015
Kessleria wehrlii - Huemer & Tarmann, 1992 
Kessleria petrobiella-group
Kessleria nivescens - Burmann, 1980
Kessleria petrobiella - (Zeller, 1868)
Kessleria albanica-group
Kessleria albanica - Friese, 1960 
Kessleria burmanni - Huemer & Tarmann, 1992 
Kessleria hauderi - Huemer & Tarmann, 1992 
Kessleria insubrica - Huemer & Tarmann, 1992 
Kessleria macedonica - Huemer & Tarmann, 1992
Kessleria apenninica-group
Kessleria apenninica - Huemer & Mutanen, 2015
Kessleria brachypterella - Huemer & Tarmann, 1992 
Kessleria brevicornuta - Huemer & Tarmann, 1992 
Kessleria diabolica - Huemer & Tarmann, 1992 
Kessleria pyrenaea - Friese, 1960 
Kessleria zimmermanni-group
Kessleria albomaculata - Huemer & Tarmann, 1992 
Kessleria caflischiella - (Frey, 1880)
Kessleria zimmermannii - Novicki, 1864 
Kessleria albescens-group
Kessleria albescens - (Rebel, 1899)
Kessleria helvetica - Huemer & Tarmann, 1992 
Kessleria inexpectata - Huemer & Tarmann, 1992 
Kessleria klimeschi - Huemer & Tarmann, 1992 
Kessleria orobiae - Huemer & Mutanen, 2015
Subgenus Hofmannia Heinemann & Wocke, 1877
Kessleria fasciapennella - (Stainton, 1849)
Kessleria saxifragae - (Stainton, 1868)

Unplaced
Kessleria copidota - (Meyrick, 1889) 
Kessleria corusca - Meyrick, 1914 
Kessleria insulella - Moriuti, 1977 
Kessleria malgassaella - Viette, 1955 
Kessleria neuguineae - Moriuti, 1981 
Kessleria nivosa - (Meyrick, 1938)
Kessleria parnassiae - (Braun, 1940)
Kessleria pseudosericella - Moriuti, 1977

Former species
Kessleria longipenella - Friese, 1960

References

 , 1960: Revision der paläarktischen Yponomeutidae unter besonderer Berücksichtigung der Genitalien (Lepidoptera). Beiträge zur Entomologie, 10 (1–2): 1–131. Abstraft: .
  & , 1991: Westpaläarktische Gespinstmotten der Gattung Kessleria Nowicki: Taxonomie, Ökologie, Verbeitung (Lep., Yponomeutidae). Mitteilungen der Münchner Entomologischen Gesellschaft, 81: 5–110. Full article: .
 ,  2015: Alpha taxonomy of the genus Kessleria Nowicki, 1864, revisited in light of DNA-barcoding (Lepidoptera, Yponomeutidae). ZooKeys, 503: 89-133. 

Yponomeutidae